Setalunula is a genus of flies in the family Tachinidae.

Species
S. blepharipoides Chao & Yang, 1990

References

Diptera of Asia
Exoristinae
Tachinidae genera